Karachi Kings (abbreviated as KK) is a Pakistani professional franchise Twenty20 cricket team that competes in the Pakistan Super League (PSL). The team is based in Karachi, the provincial capital of Sindh, and was formed in 2015 by the Pakistan Cricket Board (PCB). The team's home ground is the National Stadium. 

The team is currently coached by Johan Botha . They won their first PSL title in PSL V after beating their rivals Lahore Qalandars in the final on 17 November 2020.

The leading run-scorer for the side is Babar Azam, while Mohammad Amir is the leading wicket-taker.

Franchise history

On 3 December 2015, the PCB announced the owners of the initial five city-based franchises. The Karachi franchise was sold to the ARY Media Group for US$26 million for a ten-year period making it the most expensive franchise in the tournament. However, in 2017, new franchise Multan Sultans replaced Karachi Kings as the most expensive team in PSL history after the team was sold for US$41.6 million for an eight-year agreement.

2016 season

The Kings kicked off their campaign with an easy win against the Lahore Qalandars at the Dubai International Cricket Stadium, with Mohammad Amir getting a hat-trick.

The Kings only won one more match during the group stage of the tournament, finishing with two wins and six losses. They finished fourth in the league table however, above Lahore Qalandars with a better head-to-head record, and qualified for the league play-off stage.

Ravi Bopara replaced Shoaib Malik as the team captain ahead of the qualifier match against Islamabad United. After being restricted to their lowest score of the tournament (111), Karachi were defeated by nine wickets in the 15th over and were eliminated from the tournament.

2017 season

Kumar Sangakkara and Babar Azam joined Karachi for the second season of the PSL whilst Azhar Mehmood signed on as a coach. Sohail Tanvir was traded for Chris Gayle of the Lahore Qalandars during the off-season trade window. During the 2017 PSL players draft, Karachi retained Shoaib Malik, Imad Wasim, Ravi Bopara, Mohammad Amir, Sohail Khan, Saifullah Bangash, and Shahzaib Hasan. The team added nine players to the squad, including Kieron Pollard, Mahela Jayawardena and Ryan McLaren.

In their first game, Karachi Kings lost to Peshawar Zalmi by 7 wickets in a one-sided affair that saw them post a target of just 118 runs in their 20 overs. In the following game, against the Quetta Gladiators, the Kings failed to defend 160 and lost by 7 wickets yet again. Even as the tournament progressed to Sharjah, the Kings continued their losing streak. Facing a loss this time to arch-rivals, Lahore Qalandars. The match was closely fought and a partnership of 101 runs between veterans Kumar Sangakkara and Shoaib Malik almost won it for the Kings. But in the end they fell short of the target of 180 by 7 runs. But in the next game, against defending champions Islamabad United. The team finally managed to put themselves on the points table. The win came through the Duckworth-Lewis method as the Kings were ahead of the par score by 8 runs when returning rain forced to abandon the already 13-over match. In their final game of the Sharjah leg, the Kings continued their winning streak to get past Peshawar Zalmi in a thrilling contest. Setting up a target of 175, the Kings had the Zalmis reduced to 69-6 before Shahid Afridi and Darren Sammy combined in a 70-run partnership that almost won the game for the Zalmis. However, the Kings' bowling prevailed in the end to give their team a 9-run victory.

As the tournament moved back to Dubai, the Kings couldn't continue their winning streak and lost to table-toppers, Quetta Gladiators, by 6 wickets. Batting first, the Kings set a target of 155 runs, which they were unable to defend despite a 3-wicket-over from pacer Sohail Khan. This loss pushed the Karachi Kings to the bottom of the table once again. However, in the next game, which had become a must-win for both participating teams, the Kings managed to prevail over their rivals the Lahore Qalandars in a thrilling last-ball finish. Chasing 156, the team required 10 runs from the last two balls, which Kieron Pollard surpassed with back-to-back sixes to keep his team alive in the tournament.

Karachi then had to protect their net run rate in the very next league match, against Islamabad United, to qualify for the eliminator. In a rain-marred game, restricted to 15-overs-a-side, they were set a target of 124 by Islamabad and they had to score at least 111 runs to qualify for the eliminator. Gayle set the tempo through his blitzing knock of 44 off a mere 17 balls. The game was superbly finished by none other than Pollard himself on the second last ball of the match via a boundary. Gayle's knock and Pollard's finishing helped Karachi win this encounter against Islamabad.

Consequently, Karachi again faced Islamabad in the eliminator. In what proved to be a thrilling game, Karachi, batting first, scored a measly 126 getting all out in the process. Islamabad was set to win and qualify for the second play off. However, that was not the case as the second innings proved. The Karachi bowlers outshone the Islamabad bowlers with Muhammad Amir, Imad Wasim and Usama Mir each picking up three wickets. Islamabad were all out for a mere 82 runs, their lowest in the tournament and the second-lowest in the tournament's history. Hence, the defending champions were knocked out and Karachi lived another day in the tournament and qualified for the second play-off.

2018 season

On 7 April 2017 Shahid Afridi joined the team as president and player, and left Peshawar Zalmi. Mitchell Johnson was replaced by Tymal Mills as he pulled out from the tournament a month before 2018 season.
In their opening match of the 2018 season, Kings ended the two-season losing streak against Quetta Gladiators by beating them by 19 runs. In their next game, the Kings continued their winning form by beating the defending champions, Peshawar Zalmi, in a closely fought game. Chasing a target of 132 runs, the team won with 2 balls and 5 wickets to spare. Their next game was against arch-rivals, Lahore Qalandars. Batting first, the Kings posted 159 for 9 on the board thanks to Bopara's unbeaten innings of 50 runs. In reply, the Qalandars got off to a great start, and were 68 for 1 inside 6 overs, but 3 quick wickets from man of the match, Shahid Afridi, ensured a third consecutive win for his side as the Qalandars fell short by 27 runs. The Kings got eliminated in the match second eliminator match played at Lahore on 21 March 2018 against Peshawar Zalmi.

As the league progressed to Sharjah, the Kings' game against Multan Sultans was washed out due to persistent rain. In the next game, against Islamabad United, the team's unbeaten run in the season was ended. Batting first, the Kings posted the highest target in Sharjah that year - 154 runs - before failing to defend it and losing the match by 8 wickets.

2019 season

Before the 2019 season, Wasim Akram joined the franchise as president.

2020 season

In PSL V, Karachi Kings reached the finals for the first time in PSL history after defeating the Multan Sultans in the qualifier match that went into a Super Over. They also went on to win the PSL V under the leadership of Imad Wasim. Karachi Kings defeated the Lahore Qalandars by five wickets in the final to win their maiden PSL title.

2021 season

In the 2021 season of PSL, Karachi Kings had an excellent kickstart with winning their first match of the season against Quetta Gladiators.

2022 season

2023 season

Team identity
The team name and logo were revealed on 21 December 2015. The logo features a lion with Karachi Kings written below in white and gold colors. At the ceremony, team owner Salman Iqbal said that the logo and the theme of the team represented the true spirit and resilience of Karachi. The team's primary jersey color is blue and gold. The jersey also incorporates the roaring lion logo in the bottom left of the shirt. AJ Sports (a sports manufacturing company) is the team's kit manufacturer.

Bahria Town, the largest real-estate developers and investors in Pakistan and the largest private housing society in Asia were the team's title sponsors for first three seasons. Besides Bahria Town other sponsors were Summit Bank, The Arkadians, Oye Hoye, Pepsi, Brighto Paints and Shield Corporation Ltd. Their official main principle partner for the 2017 season was Naya Nazimabad. Bridge Power was platinum sponsor.
Cotton & Cotton signed an agreement to be their official apparel partner in December 2016. Vital Tea was their tea partner, their print media partner was the Pakistan Observer and
Titans were their memorabilia partner.

Anthems 
The anthem of the team for 2017 season titled "Dhan Dhana Dhan Hoga Re" was sung by Shehzad Roy. As for 2018 season, "De Dhana Dhan" was the team's official anthem sung again by Shehzad Roy.

Ambassadors 
Pakistani film stars Fahad Mustafa, Humayun Saeed and singer Shehzad Roy are the team's star ambassadors.

Sponsors

Rivalry

Karachi Kings have an active rivalry with Lahore Qalandars, and is considered to be the biggest rivalry in the PSL due to the historic economic and cultural rivalry between the cities of the two teams. As of the 2022* season, both teams have played 14 times, with the Kings coming out victorious 8 times. Both teams have a large fan following which makes their matches more intense and interesting to watch. Both teams are known to be the expensive teams of PSL.

Current squad

Management and coaching staff

Captains

Source: ESPNcricinfo, Last updated: 18 February 2022

Result summary

Overall result in PSL

 Tie+W and Tie+L indicates matches tied and then won or Lost in a tiebreaker such as a bowlout or one-over-eliminator ("Super Over")
  The result percentage excludes no results and counts ties (irrespective of a tiebreaker) as half a win.

Source: ESPNcricinfo, Last updated: 20 February 2022

Head-to-head record

Pakistan Super League 

Source: ESPNcricinfo, Last updated: 24 January 2022

Outside PSL

Statistics

Most runs 

Source: ESPNcricinfo, Last updated: 24 January 2022

Most wickets 

Source: ESPNcricinfo, Last Updated: 24 January 2022

See also
 Karachi Kings–Lahore Qalandars rivalry
List of Pakistan Super League anthems
Karachi Dolphins
Karachi Zebras
Larkana Bulls

References

External links

 
Sport in Karachi
Cricket clubs established in 2016
Sports clubs in Pakistan
Cricket in Karachi
2016 establishments in Pakistan